Parthenina moolenbeeki is a species of sea snail, a marine gastropod mollusk in the family Pyramidellidae, the pyrams and their allies.

Description
Original description: "Elongated cone shaped shell, not very robust, whitish coloured. Heterostrophic protoconch with sunken nucleus, sculptured spirally by 4/5 marked cordlets. Teleoconch made up of 3/4 rather convex whorls with an incised suture; these whorls are sculptured axially by slightly wavy prosocline riblets of about the same width as the interspaces. On the body whorl there are 25/30 riblets which extend right up to the base; in adult specimens they are more numerous and closer together. One or, more rarely, two spiral cordlets are present on the superior whorls; always two, well spaced, on the body whorl. Round quadrangular mouth with visible columellar tooth on the inside. Umblical slit evident in adult specimens. Maximum dimensions: height 2 mm. Diameter 1 mm. Operculum and soft parts unknown."

Distribution
Locus typicus: Island of Ponza.

This marine species occurs in the following locations:
 European waters (ERMS scope)

References

 Giannuzzi-Savelli R., Pusateri F., Micali, P., Nofroni, I., Bartolini S. (2014). Atlante delle conchiglie marine del Mediterraneo, vol. 5 (Heterobranchia). Edizioni Danaus, Palermo, pp. 1– 111 with 41 unnumbered plates (figs. 1-363), appendix pp. 1–91 page(s): 66, appendix p. 20

External links
 CLEMAM
 Encyclopedia of Life
 World Register of Marine Species

Pyramidellidae
Gastropods described in 1987